"Jerat Percintaan" (in English: "Love Snare" or "Love Trap") is the first single and award-winning song performed by Malaysian pop singer Siti Nurhaliza. It earned the Best Song award at the Anugerah Industri Muzik in 1997.

The song previously won Best Performance, Ballad Song Champion as well as Song Champion awards at the Anugerah Juara Lagu in 1996. During this competition, Siti faced strong competitors such as Ziana Zain and Fauziah Latiff. Anugerah Juara Lagu is a competition held by TV3.

Song
The melody to "Jerat Percintaan" was composed by Adnan Abu Hassan and lyrics written by Othman Zainuddin and Hani M.J.

Release and reception
"Jerat Percintaan" was released as the main track of Siti Nurhaliza I in 1996. It was well-received and became one of her signature songs.

Awards

Anugerah Juara Lagu

Anugerah Industri Muzik

References

External links
 Lyrics of this song at AllTheLyrics

1996 debut singles
1996 songs
Siti Nurhaliza songs